First Saturday of every month is earmarked National Sanitation Day across Ghana. First declared on November 1, 2014 by the Government of Ghana in response to the 2014 Ghanaian cholera outbreak, the day is a voluntary clean-up exercise for all Ghanaian residents in an effort to reduce unsanitary conditions that breed diseases and causes injuries.

The National Sanitation Day (NSD) is an initiative by the Ministry of Local Government and Rural Development. A bill has recently been sent to parliament by the ministry, the bill if approved will give legal  backing to the NSD program allowing it to prosecute individuals who refuse to take part in the program.

See also
Water supply and sanitation in Ghana
Clean Up the World

References

Litter
Environmental awareness days